The 2010 European Mountain Running Championships were held on 4 July in Sapareva Banya, Bulgaria. They were that year's area championships for mountain running, held by the European Athletic Association in conjunction with the Bulgarian Athletic Federation. The competition featured four races, with senior and junior races for both men and women. The 2010 competition featured an uphill–downhill course format. A total of 237 runners from 24 nations started the competition and two further nations (Norway and Greece) were present as observers.

The men's race was 12.2 km long and featured an ascent and descent of 685 m on each of its three laps. The women's and junior men's races were 9 km long comprising two laps with a rise and fall of 495 m. The junior women's race was one lap of 4.6 km over a hill of 235 m.

Ahmet Arslan took his fourth consecutive men's title by some distance, while Italians Martin Dematteis and Marco De Gasperi completed the podium and helped Italy retain its undefeated streak in the men's team competition. The 2010 Grand Ballon race winner Marie Laure Dumergues took the women's title continuing her good form in a breakthrough year. Valentina Belotti was the women's runner-up for a second year running and Elena Nagovitsyna was the bronze medallist. Hüseyin Pak won the junior men's race while Denisa Dragomir was the women's junior champion.

Results

Men

Totals: 80 starters, 78 finishers, 19 national teams.

Women

Totals: 64 starters, 60 finishers, 13 national teams.

Junior men

Totals: 59 starters, 58 finishers, 15 national teams.

Junior women

Totals: 39 starters, 38 finishers, 12 national teams.

Participation
A total of 24 nations had athletes which took part in the 2010 Championships. On top of this, Norway and Greece had observers present.

References

External links
Official website
European Athletics competition page

European Mountain Running Championships
European Mountain
European Mountain
European Mountain Running Championships
European Mountain Running Championships
International athletics competitions hosted by Bulgaria